The State Register of Heritage Places is maintained by the Heritage Council of Western Australia. , 224 places are heritage-listed in the Shire of Woodanilling, of which one is on the State Register of Heritage Places, the Carrolup Aboriginal Cemetery in Marribank. The cemetery is part of the also state heritage listed Carrolup Native Settlement, which was state heritage listed on 22 May 2007 but is predominantly located in the neighbouring Shire of Kojonup.

List

State Register of Heritage Places
The Western Australian State Register of Heritage Places, lists the following state registered place within the Shire of Woodanilling:

Shire of Woodanilling heritage-listed places
The following places are heritage listed in the Shire of Woodanilling but are not State registered:

References

Woodanilling
Great Southern (Western Australia)